The house at 59–63 Crystal Street in Southbridge, Massachusetts is a well-preserved multiunit residential structure built to provide worker housing for the American Optical Company around the turn of the 20th century.  It is a 2.5-story wood-frame house, in a late Victorian style with both Italianate and Colonial Revival elements.  Its side hall, gable front appearance is typical of many late 19th century houses in Southbridge.

The house was listed on the National Register of Historic Places in 1989.

See also
National Register of Historic Places listings in Southbridge, Massachusetts
National Register of Historic Places listings in Worcester County, Massachusetts

References

Houses in Southbridge, Massachusetts
Colonial Revival architecture in Massachusetts
Italianate architecture in Massachusetts
Houses completed in 1899
National Register of Historic Places in Southbridge, Massachusetts
Houses on the National Register of Historic Places in Worcester County, Massachusetts